The 2003 Ontario Nokia Cup, Southern Ontario's men's provincial curling championship, was held January 25-February 2 at the Hershey Centre in Mississauga.

Ottawa's Bryan Cochrane won his lone provincial championship of his career. His rink of Bill Gamble, Ian MacAulay and John Steski would represent Ontario at the 2003 Nokia Brier.

The event was boycotted by the Wayne Middaugh and Glenn Howard rinks who were still in a dispute with the Canadian Curling Association over receiving a share of Brier revenues.

Teams

Standings

Tie-breaker
Corner 9-3 Grant

Playoffs

References

1 vs. 2 game
3 vs. 4 game
Semi-final
Final 
Nokia Cup coverage on CurlingZone

Ontario Tankard
2003 in Canadian curling
Sport in Mississauga
2003 in Ontario